Amanda is a Latin feminine gerundive (i.e. verbal adjective) name meaning, literally, “she who must (or is fit to) be loved”. Other translations, with similar meaning, could be "deserving to be loved," "worthy of love," or "loved very much by everyone." Its diminutive form includes Mandy, Manda, Aman and Amy. It is common in countries where Germanic and Romance languages are spoken.

"Amanda" comes from ama- (the stem of the Latin verb amare, "to love") plus the feminine nominative singular gerundive ending (-nda). Other names, especially female names, were derived from this verb form, such as “Miranda”.

The name "Amanda" occasionally appears in Late Antiquity, such as the Amanda who was the 'wife of the ex-advocate and ex-provincial governor Aper (q.v.); she cared for his estates and raised their children after he adopted the monastic life: "curat illa saeculi curas, ne tu cures”' [Paul. Nol. Epist. 44.4].

In England the name "Amanda" first appears in 1212 on a birth record from Warwickshire, England, and five centuries later the name was popularized by poets and playwrights. In the United States, "Amanda" slowly became more prominent from the 1930s to the 1960s, ranking among the top 200 baby names.

From 1976 to 1995, "Amanda" ranked in the ten most popular female baby names in the United States. The name was most popular from 1978 to 1992, when it ranked in the top four. At its prime, in 1980, it was the second most popular. In 2009, "Amanda" ranked number 166. It was ranked among the top ten names given to girls born in Puerto Rico in 2009. The name has also recently been popular in Sweden, where it ranked twentieth for girls born in 2009, down five places from the year 2008. It is also popular in Swedish-speaking families in Finland, where it ranked among the top ten names for girls born to this demographic group.

People
 Amanda Abbington (born 1974), English actress
 Amanda Adams (born 1976), American archaeologist and author
 Amanda Aday (born 1981), American actress
 Amanda L. Aikens (1833–1892), American editor and philanthropist
 Amanda Alcantara, Dominican–American activist and writer
 Amanda Aldridge (1866–1956), English opera singer and teacher
 Amanda Alfaro (born 2001), Costa Rican swimmer
 Amanda Allen (born 2005), Canadian soccer player
 Amanda Ammar (born 1986), Canadian skier
 Amanda Andradóttir (born 2003), Icelandic soccer player
 Amanda Anisimova (born 2001), Russian–American tennis player
 Amanda Annan (born 1982), Ghanaian–English actress, entrepreneur, model and writer
 Amanda Ansell (born 1976), English artist
 Amanda Araújo (born 1990), Brazilian rugby player
 Amanda Asay (1988–2022), Canadian baseball and ice hockey player
 Amanda Auchter (born 1977), American professor and writer
 Amanda Austin (1859–1917), American painter and sculptor
 Amanda Ayala (born 1997), American singer, songwriter and musician
 Amanda Baker (born 1979), American actress
 Amanda Balionis (born 1985), American sports journalist
 Amanda Balon (born 1997), American actress and dancer
 Amanda Banton (born 1970), Australian lawyer
 Amanda Barr (born 1982), English soccer player
 Amanda Barrie (born 1935), English actress
 Amanda Basica (born 1978), American tennis player
 Amanda Bateman (born 1996), Australian rower
 Amanda Batten (born 1979), American politician
 Amanda Bauer (born 1979), American astronomer
 Amanda Bayer, American economist
 Amanda Beard (born 1981), American swimmer
 Amanda Bearse (born 1958), American actress, comedian and director
 Amanda Bell (born 1988), American mixed martial artist
 Amanda Bennett (born 1952), American author and journalist
 Amanda Berenguer (1921–2010), Uruguayan poet
 Amanda Bergman, Swedish musician, singer and songwriter
 Amanda Billing (born 1976), New Zealand actress
 Amanda Billings (born 1986), Canadian figure skater
 Amanda Bingson (born 1990), American track and field athlete
 Amanda Black (born 1993), South African singer and songwriter
 Amanda Blake (1929–1989), American actress
 Amanda Blank (born 1983), American rapper
 Amanda Bloor (born 1962), English Anglican priest
 Amanda Blumenherst (born 1986), American golfer
 Amanda Borden (born 1977), American gymnast
 Amanda Bouldin (born 1984), American politician
 Amanda Boulier (born 1993), American ice hockey player
 Amanda Boxer (born 1948), English actress
 Amanda Boyden, American novelist
 Amanda Bradford, American marine mammal biologist
 Amanda Brailsford, American judge
 Amanda Bresnan (born 1971), Australian politician
 Amanda Broderick (born 1971), English academic and administrator
 Amanda Brooks (born 1981), American actress
 Amanda Brotchie, Australian director and writer
 Amanda Browder (born 1976), American installation artist
 Amanda Brugel (born 1978), Canadian actress
 Amanda Brundage (born 1991), American mixed martial artist
 Amanda Brunker (born 1974), Irish columnist, journalist and novelist
 Amanda Budden (born 1994), Irish soccer player
 Amanda Burden (born 1944), American urban planner
 Amanda Burton (born 1956), Northern Irish actress
 Amanda Busick (born 1986), American sports reporter
 Amanda Junquera Butler (1898–1986), Spanish writer
 Amanda Butler (born 1972), American basketball coach and player
 Amanda Bynes (born 1986), American actress
 Amanda Byram (born 1973), Irish television presenter
 Amanda Cajander (1827–1871), Finnish deaconess
 Amanda Cappelletti (born 1986), American lawyer and politician
 Amanda Carpenter (born 1982), American author and political commentator
 Amanda Mildred Carr (born 1990), Thai BMX cyclist
 Amanda Carter (born 1964), Australian wheelchair basketball player
 Amanda Cassatt (born 1991), American entrepreneur and journalist
 Amanda Castro (1962–2010), Honduran poet
 Amanda Cerny (born 1991), American internet personality and model
 Amanda Chase (born 1969), American politician
 Amanda Chetwynd, British mathematician and statistician
 Amanda Chidester (born 1990), American softball player
 Amanda Chudoba (born 1990), Canadian trap shooter 
 Amanda Cinalli (born 1986), American soccer player
 Amanda Clapham (born 1990), English actress
 Amanda Clayton (born 1981), American actress
 Amanda Clement (1888–1971), American baseball umpire
 Amanda Coetzer (born 1971), South African tennis player
 Amanda Coker (born 1992), American cyclist
 Amanda Coneo (born 1996), Colombian volleyball player
 Amanda Congdon (born 1981), American video blogger
 Amanda Conner, American comics artist
 Amanda Conway (born 1997), American ice hockey player
 Amanda Coogan (born 1971), Irish performance artist
 Amanda Lindsey Cook (born 1984), Canadian christian musician
 Amanda Cooper (born 1991), American mixed martial artist
 Amanda Coplin, American novelist
 Amanda Cottreau, Canadian singer and songwriter
 Amanda Crew (born 1986), Canadian actress
 Amanda Cromwell (born 1970), American soccer coach and player
 Amanda Curtis (born 1979), American politician
 Amanda DaCosta (born 1989), American–born Portuguese soccer player
 Amanda Demme, American photographer
 Amanda Díaz, Puerto Rican beauty queen
 Amanda Dobbs (born 1993), American figure skater
 Amanda Doman (born 1977), Australian softball player
 Amanda Donohoe (born 1962), English actress
 Amanda Minnie Douglas (1831–1916), American writer
 Amanda Dowe (born 1991), American basketball player
 Amanda Downum (born 1979), American author
 Amanda Drew (born 1969), English actress
 Amanda Dudamel (born 1999), Venezuelan beauty queen, fashion designer, model and philanthropist
 Amanda Ruter Dufour (1822–1899), American poet
 Amanda Ebeye (born 1986), Nigerian actress and model
 Amanda Edgren (born 1993), Swedish soccer player
 Amanda Edwards, American attorney and politician
 Amanda Eliasch (born 1960), English artist, photographer and poet
 Amanda Elwes (born 1964), English actress
 Amanda Evora (born 1984), American figure skater
 Amanda Farías (born 1989), American politician
 Amanda Farrugia (born 1985), Australian rules footballer
 Amanda Favier (born 1979), French violinist
 Amanda Fazio (born 1954), Australian politician
 Amanda Ferguson (born 1967), English fencer
 Amanda Figueras (born 1978), Spanish journalist
 Amanda Filipacchi (born 1967), French–American novelist
 Amanda Fink (born 1986), American tennis player
 Amanda Fisher, English cell biologist
 Amanda Folsom (born 1979), American mathematician
 Amanda Fondell (born 1994), Swedish singer
 Amanda Fortier (born 1978), Canadian skier
 Amanda Fosang, Australian biomedical researcher
 Amanda Freitag (born 1972), American author and chef
 Amanda Fuller (born 1984), American actress
 Amanda Gailey (born 1976), American academic and political activist
 Amanda Garner (born 1985), Australian ballroom dancer
 Amanda Gates (born 1986), Canadian curler
 Amanda Gefter (born 1980}, American writer
 Amanda Ghost (born 1974), English music executive, singer and songwriter
 Amanda Glover (born 1970), English beach volleyball player
 Amanda González (born 1979), Spanish field hockey player
 Amanda Goodman, American actress and voice artist
 Amanda Gorman (born 1998), American activist and poet
 Amanda Grace, American singer and songwriter
 Amanda Grahame (born 1979), Australian tennis player
 Amanda Griffin (born 1979), Filipino–English model and television presenter
 Amanda Grosserode (born 1975), American politician
 Amanda Grunfeld (born 1967), English tennis player
 Amanda Gutierres (born 2001), Brazilian soccer player
 Amanda Hale (born 1982), British actress
 Amanda K. Hale, Canadian writer
 Amanda Hamilton (born 1974), Scottish broadcaster, businesswoman and nutritionist
 Amanda Hardy (born 1971), Australian badminton player
 Amanda Harkimo (born 1990), Finnish disk jockey
 Amanda Harlech (born 1958), English creative consultant and writer
 Amanda Bartlett Harris (1824–1917), American author and literary critic
 Amanda Harris (born 1963), Australian–born English actress
 Amanda Harrison (born 1974), Australian actress and singer
 Amanda Havard (born 1986), American writer
 Amanda Hearst (born 1984), American fashion model and socialite
 Amanda Hemmingsen-Jaeger, American politician
 Amanda Hendrick (born 1990), Scottish model
 Amanda Hendrix (born 1968), American planetary scientist
 Amanda Heng (born 1951), Singaporean artist and curator
 Amanda Herbert (born 1943), British cytopathologist and histopathologist
 Amanda Hess, American journalist
 Amanda Hesser (born 1972), American author and writer
 Amanda Hickey (1838–1894), American surgeon
 Amanda Hillwood (born 1957), English actress
 Amanda Hocking (born 1984), American writer
 Amanda Hodgkinson (born 1965), English novelist
 Amanda Holden (born 1971), English actress and singer
 Amanda Holiday (born 1964), Sierra Leonean–English artist and poet
 Amanda Hollis-Brusky, American scholar
 Amanda Hopmans (born 1976), Dutch tennis player
 Amanda Houston (born 1980), English weather presenter
 Amanda Howard (born 1973), Australian author and writer
 Amanda Howe, British doctor
 Amanda Husberg (1940–2021), American composer
 Amanda Ilestedt (born 1993), Swedish soccer player
 Amanda Jackson (born 1985), Armenian–American basketball player
 Amanda James (born 1960), British swimmer
 Amanda Jamieson (born 1997), New Zealand racing cyclist
 Amanda Jelks (born 1986), American actress
 Amanda Jenssen (born 1988), Swedish singer and songwriter
 Amanda Jetter (born 1994), American artistic gymnast
 Amanda Johnston (born 1977), American poet
 Amanda Joy, Canadian actress, comedian, producer and writer
 Amanda Keen (born 1978), English tennis player
 Amanda Keller (born 1962), Australian actress, comedian, journalist, radio and television personality
 Amanda Kelly (born 1982), Scottish kickboxer and mixed martial artist
 Amanda Kerfstedt (1835–1920), Swedish novelist and playwright
 Amanda Kernell (born 1986), Swedish director and screenwriter
 Amanda Kessel (born 1991), American ice hockey player
 Amanda Kloots (born 1982), American actress, dancer and fitness instructor
 Amanda Knox (born 1987), American woman exonerated in Italy for the murder of Meredith Kercher
 Amanda Kolczynski (born 1993), French handballer
 Amanda Kotaja (born 1995), Finnish Paralympic athlete
 Amanda Kotze (born 1986), South African sprinter
 Amanda Kozak (born 1984), American beauty queen
 Amanda Kramer (born 1961), American composer and touring musician
 Amanda Kurtović (born 1991), Norwegian handballer
 Amanda Labarca (1886–1975), Chilean diplomat, educator and writer
 Amanda Laine (born 1992), Canadian model
 Amanda Lamb (born 1972), English model, property expert and television presenter
 Amanda Lang (born 1970), Canadian business journalist
 Amanda Langlet (born 1967), French actress
 Amanda Lassiter (born 1979), American basketball player
 Amanda Lathlin (born 1976), Canadian politician
 Amanda Lawrence (born 1971), English actress
 Amanda Lear (born 1939), French actress, model, painter, singer, songwriter and television presenter
 Amanda Leduc, Canadian writer
 Amanda Leighton (born 1993), American actress
 Amanda Lemos (born 1987), Brazilian mixed martial artist
 Amanda Leveille (born 1994), Canadian ice hockey player
 Amanda Levens (born 1979), American basketball coach
 Amanda Lightfoot (born 1987), English biathlete
 Amanda Lim (born 1993), Singaporean freestyle swimmer
 Amanda Lind (born 1980), Swedish politician
 Amanda Lindhout (born 1981), Canadian humanitarian, journalist and public speaker
 Amanda Linnér (born 2001), Swedish golfer
 Amanda Lipitz (born 1980), American director
 Amanda Locke (born 1989), American softball player
 Amanda Lohrey (born 1947), Australian novelist and writer
 Amanda Lorenz (born 1997), American softball player
 Amanda Lovelace (born 1991), American poet
 Amanda Marshall (born 1972), Canadian singer
 Amanda McGrory (born 1986), American wheelchair athlete
 Amanda Mealing (born 1967), English actress, director and producer
 Amanda H. Mercier (born 1975), American judge
 Amanda Micheli, American filmmaker
 Amanda Miguel (born 1956), Argentine singer
 Amanda Nunes (born 1988), Brazilian mixed martial artist
 Amanda Obdam (born 1993), Thai actress and model
 Amanda Overmyer (born 1984), American singer
 Amanda Palmer (born 1976), American musician, singer and songwriter
 Amanda Peet (born 1972), American actress
 Amanda Perez (born 1980), American singer
 Amanda Peterson (1971–2015), American actress
 Amanda Petrusich (born 1980), American music journalist
 Amanda Pilke (born 1990), Finnish actress
 Amanda Plummer (born 1957), American actress
 Amanda Randolph (1896–1967), American actress, musician and singer
 Amanda Ratnayake (born 1990), Sri Lankan beauty queen and businesswoman
 Amanda Redman (born 1957), English actress
 Amanda Reid (born 1996), Australian Paralympic cyclist and swimmer
 Amanda Ribas (born 1993), Brazilian mixed martial artist
 Amanda Righetti (born 1983), American actress
 Amanda Rylander (1832–1920), Swedish actress
 Amanda Sampedro (born 1993), Spanish soccer player
 Amanda Schull (born 1978), American actress and ballet dancer
 Amanda Seales (born 1981), American actress, comedian, recording artist and radio personality
 Amanda Setton (born 1985), American actress
 Amanda Seyfried (born 1985), American actress and singer
 Amanda Shires (born 1982), American fiddler, singer and songwriter
 Amanda Simpson (born 1961), businesswoman and politician, first openly transgender woman political appointee
 Amanda Somerville (born 1979), American singer, songwriter and vocal coach
 Amanda Stepto (born 1970), Canadian actress and disk jockey
 Amanda Strang (born 1980), French actress, fashion model, singer and television presenter
 Amanda Swisten (born 1978), American actress and model
 Amanda Tapping (born 1965), English–born Canadian actress
 Amanda Tenfjord (born 1997), Greek–Norwegian singer and songwriter
 Amanda Tobin (born 1960), Australian tennis player
 Amanda Vanstone (born 1952), Australian politician
 Amanda Wakeley (born 1962), English fashion designer
 Amanda Waring, English actress and campaigner
 Amanda Weir (born 1986), American swimmer
 Amanda Winn-Lee, American voice artist and writer

Fictional characters
 Amanda, from the teen drama The Next Step
 Amanda, from the Colley Cibber play Love's Last Shift and its sequel by John Vanbrugh, The Relapse
 Amanda, from the Highlander franchise
 Amanda Becker, from the teen parody Not Another Teen Movie
 Amanda Beckett, from the teen romantic comedy Can't Hardly Wait
 Amanda Bellows, from the ABC fantasy comedy I Dream of Jeannie
 Amanda Benson, from the television movie Swindle
 Amanda Bentley, the titular character from the Candice F. Ransom novel Amanda
 Amanda Brotzman, from the BBC science fiction series Dirk Gently's Holistic Detective Agency
 Amanda Buckman, from the supernatural black comedy Addams Family Values
 Amanda Carrington, from the ABC soap opera Dynasty
 Amanda Clarke, from ABC mystery drama Revenge
 Helen "Amanda" Collins, from The CW action thriller Nikita
 Amanda De Santa, from the video game Grand Theft Auto V
 Amanda Grayson, mother of Spock from the Star Trek franchise
 Amanda Harper, from the Escape Room franchise
 Amanda Hunsaker, from the buddy cop action comedy Lethal Weapon
 Amanda Killman, the main antagonist from the Nickelodeon animated slapstick comedy Bunsen Is a Beast
 Amanda King, from the CBS drama Scarecrow and Mrs. King
 Amanda Krueger, the mother of Freddy Krueger from the A Nightmare on Elm Street franchise
 Amanda LaRusso, the wife of Daniel LaRusso from the Netflix martial arts comedy Cobra Kai
 Amanda Dillon, from the ABC soap opera All My Children
 Amanda Dunfrey, from the science fiction horror film The Mist
 Amanda Prendergast, from the action film Falling Down
 Amanda Rollins, from the NBC crime drama Law and Order: Special Victims Unit
 Amanda Rosewater, from the Syfy science fiction western Defiance
 Amanda Sefton, from Marvel Comics
 Amanda Tanen, from the ABC comedy drama Ugly Betty
 Amanda Toad, from the video game Star Fox
 Amanda Vale, from the Seven Network soap opera Home and Away
 Amanda Valenciano Libre, from the video game Metal Gear
 Amanda Vaughn, the main protagonist from the ABC comedy drama GCB
 Amanda Waller, from DC Comics
 Amanda Wingfield, from the Tennessee Williams play The Glass Menagerie
 Amanda Woods, from the romantic comedy The Holiday
 Amanda Woodward, from the Fox soap opera Melrose Place
 Amanda Young, the accomplice of Jigsaw from the Saw franchise
 Amanda Zimm, from the teen drama Ready or Not

References

Further reading

English feminine given names
Latin feminine given names